Thurlby is a village and civil parish in the North Kesteven district of Lincolnshire, England, about  south-west of the city of Lincoln and about  north-east of the town of Newark-on-Trent. It is most notable for Thurlby Hall, home of the Bromhead baronets. The population is included in the civil parish of Witham St Hughs.

Thurlby is mentioned in Domesday Book – in 1086 the village consisted of 22 households. 

The parish church is a Grade II* listed building dedicated to Saint Germain and dating from the 11th century, with a 13th-century west tower. It was much restored in the 19th century, and has a porch over a Norman doorway and a 15th-century font. In the churchyard is a medieval churchyard cross which is believed to stand in its original position west of the tower. It is believed to have been restored in 1842 and is a scheduled monument.

Thurlby Hall is a Grade II listed small country house dating from the early 18th century. The house was the home of the Bromhead baronets. Major Sir Edmund Gonville Bromhead (1791–1870) 3rd Baronet, was the father of Gonville Bromhead who won the Victoria Cross at the 1879 battle of Rorke's Drift in the Zulu War. Gonville Bromhead's older brother Benjamin Parnell Bromhead succeeded their father as 4th Baronet.

References

External links

Civil parishes in Lincolnshire
Villages in Lincolnshire
North Kesteven District